The Doctor and the Woman is a lost 1918 American silent mystery film directed by Phillips Smalley and Lois Weber. It starred Mildred Harris and True Boardman and was produced by Weber and Universal Film Manufacturing Company as a Jewel Production. Universal distributed the film. The film is based on the 1915 novel K by Mary Roberts Rinehart.

Cast
Mildred Harris as Sidney Page
True Boardman as "K"
Alan Roscoe as Dr. Max Wilson
Zella Caull as Carlotta
Carl Miller as Joe Drummond
Esther Ralston

References

External links

 
Lantern slide (alternate version)

1918 films
American silent feature films
American black-and-white films
Lost American films
Films directed by Lois Weber
Universal Pictures films
Films based on works by Mary Roberts Rinehart
American mystery films
1918 mystery films
1918 lost films
Lost mystery films
1910s American films
Silent mystery films